Justin Hamilton (a.k.a. "Hammo") is an Australian comedian, writer and radio host.

Early life

Hamilton grew up in Adelaide, South Australia.

Career
He is a standup performer who started his comedy career in Adelaide in 1994 as part of a duo called The Bunta Boys with school mate Damien. They wrote and performed songs such as "Red Necked Boy" and "I Wanna Be Hip". The latter an inspired tribute to Rick Astley. Justin would regularly end up gyrating in an (often male) audience member's lap, or running across the stage without trousers. Both would attract much laughter. Justin appeared in the 1995 Adelaide Fringe parade as the second half of 'Buttman and Throbbin': a comedy crime fighter, wearing red fishnets and a yellow cape.

He has performed at the 'Sit'n'Spin' in Seattle and the prestigious 'Gershwin Room' in New York. Hamilton has been involved in shows at the Adelaide Fringe Festival since 1994. He has also been a regular at the Melbourne International Comedy Festival and its Roadshow, and been a support act for Wil Anderson's live stand-up shows.

He had a twice weekly podcast from 2010 to 2017 called Can You Take This Photo Please?, in which he chats to other comedians including Simon Pegg, Marc Maron, Judith Lucy, Tony Martin and Dave Anthony about their craft. The name comes from when Hamilton would be hanging out with his famous friends, and people would invariably ask him to take their photo.

Television
 
Hamilton has appeared on programmes such as The Glass House and The Librarians (2010), and he made a small guest appearance in Upper Middle Bogan, in Episode 4 of season 1.
In 2019 he was a cast member of the short-lived Saturday Night Rove.
Hamilton is the head writer and regular guest on Whovians, an ABC panel show hosted by Rove McManus that discusses the latest episodes of cult BBC show Doctor Who. He was also the head writer on the inaugural season of Network 10's quiz show, Show me the Movie.

Radio
Hamilton has been the regular movie reviewer for the Perth Mix FM Breakfast Show and was a regular guest on the Triple M radio program Wil & Lehmo.

Awards
2003 MICF Piece of Wood Award for Justin Sane
2007 Moosehead Award for Three Colours Hammo
2007 MICF Directors' Award for Three Colours Hammo
2008 Adelaide Fringe Festival Advertiser Overall Fringe Award for Three Colours Hammo
2008 MICF Barry Award nomination for The Killing Joke
2011 Equity Award for Most Outstanding Performance by an Ensemble in a Comedy Series for The Librarians
2011 The Monthly "Comedian of the Decade"
2019 Adelaide Fringe Festival Best Comedy for The Ballad of John Tilt Animus

References

External links
Official Website

Australian stand-up comedians
Triple M presenters
Living people
Year of birth missing (living people)